Roman Bugaj (born 9 August 1973) is a Polish heavyweight boxer.  Before turning to boxing he was an amateur kickboxer – winning a European title.

Career
He turned professional in 1999. More than a third of his professional fights have been in the USA.

Among his more illustrious opponents have been Sinan Şamil Sam, Scott Gammer, Ruediger May and  WBO cruiserweight title holder and British number 2 cruiserweight Enzo Maccarinelli.

Titles/Accomplishments

Amateur Kickboxing
1996 W.A.K.O. European Championships in Belgrade, Serbia & Montenegro  -86 kg (Full-Contact)
1996 W.A.K.O. European Championships in Belgrade, Serbia & Montenegro  -89 kg (Light-Contact)

Professional boxing record

|-
|align="center" colspan=8|16 Wins (9 knockouts, 7 decisions) 8 Losses (5 knockouts, 3 decisions), 1 Draw 
|-
| align="center" style="border-style: none none solid solid; background: #e3e3e3"|Result
| align="center" style="border-style: none none solid solid; background: #e3e3e3"|Record
| align="center" style="border-style: none none solid solid; background: #e3e3e3"|Opponent
| align="center" style="border-style: none none solid solid; background: #e3e3e3"|Type
| align="center" style="border-style: none none solid solid; background: #e3e3e3"|Round
| align="center" style="border-style: none none solid solid; background: #e3e3e3"|Date
| align="center" style="border-style: none none solid solid; background: #e3e3e3"|Location
| align="center" style="border-style: none none solid solid; background: #e3e3e3"|Notes
|-align=center
|Loss
|
|align=left| Enzo Maccarinelli
|TKO
|1
|4 Jun 2005
|align=left| Manchester Arena, Manchester]
|align=left|
|-
|Loss
|
|align=left| Ruediger May
|UD
|8
|4 Dec 2004
|align=left| Estrel Convention Center, Neukoeln, Berlin
|align=left|
|-
|Loss
|
|align=left| Scott Gammer
|TKO
|2
|5 Nov 2004
|align=left| Leisure Centre, Hereford, Herefordshire
|align=left|
|-
|Win
|
|align=left| Marek Zelo
|KO
|2
|24 Sep 2004
|align=left| Tarnowskie Góry
|align=left|
|-
|Win
|
|align=left| Ioan Mihai
|UD
|4
|5 Jun 2004
|align=left| Dąbrowa Górnicza
|align=left|
|-
|Loss
|
|align=left| Constantin Onofrei
|KO
|3
|23 Nov 2002
|align=left| Westfallenhalle, Dortmund, North Rhine-Westphalia
|align=left|
|-
|Loss
|
|align=left| Sinan Samil Sam
|KO
|5
|20 Jul 2002
|align=left| Westfallenhalle, Dortmund, North Rhine-Westphalia
|align=left|
|-
|Win
|
|align=left| Attila Huszka
|TKO
|3
|22 Jun 2002
|align=left| Płock
|align=left|
|-
|Win
|
|align=left| David Washington
|UD
|6
|6 Apr 2002
|align=left| Łódź
|align=left|
|-
|Loss
|
|align=left| Cengiz Koc
|SD
|6
|16 Mar 2002
|align=left| Bordelandhalle, Magdeburg, Saxony-Anhalt
|align=left|
|-
|Win
|
|align=left| Vladyslav Andreev
|PTS
|6
|24 Nov 2001
|align=left| Łódź
|align=left|
|-
|Win
|
|align=left| Robert Sulgan
|PTS
|4
|27 Oct 2001
|align=left| Pruszków, Warsaw
|align=left|
|-
|Loss
|
|align=left| Charles "Buddy" Hatcher
|TKO
|5
|20 Jul 2001
|align=left| Caesars Palace, Las Vegas, Nevada
|align=left|
|-
|Draw
|
|align=left| Donnell Wiggins
|TD
|3
|28 Apr 2001
|align=left| LaPorte Civic Center, LaPorte, Indiana
|align=left|
|-
|Loss
|
|align=left| Ron "Boogie Down" Brown
|SD
|6
|22 Feb 2001
|align=left| Harrisburg, Pennsylvania
|align=left|
|-
|Win
|
|align=left| Keith Govan
|KO
|1
|7 Sep 2000
|align=left| Teamster's Hall, Baltimore, Maryland
|align=left|
|-
|Win
|
|align=left| Alrick Lassiter
|UD
|4
|17 May 2000
|align=left| Hammerstein Ballroom, New York City
|align=left|
|-
|Win
|
|align=left| Kevin Rosier
|UD
|4
|2 Mar 2000
|align=left| Ramada Inn, Rosemont, Illinois
|align=left|
|-
|Win
|
|align=left| Ramon Hayes
|UD
|4
|2 Dec 1999
|align=left| Memorial Coliseum, Corpus Christi, Texas
|align=left|
|-
|Win
|
|align=left| Curt Render
|KO
|1
|16 Sep 1999
|align=left| Grand Casino Biloxi, Biloxi, Mississippi
|align=left|
|-
|Win
|
|align=left| Mike Royster
|TKO
|1
|26 Aug 1999
|align=left| Atlanta
|align=left|
|-
|Win
|
|align=left| Rafael Pedro
|KO
|3
|5 Aug 1999
|align=left| Grand Casino Tunica, Tunica, Mississippi
|align=left|
|-
|Win
|
|align=left| Gary Williams
|TKO
|4
|17 Jul 1999
|align=left| Gdańsk
|align=left|
|-
|Win
|
|align=left| Marian Kolpasky
|TKO
|1
|17 Apr 1999
|align=left| Warsaw
|align=left|
|-
|Win
|
|align=left| Iftikhab Ahmed
|TKO
|1
|26 Feb 1999
|align=left| Coventry Sports Centre, Coventry, West Midlands
|align=left|
|}

References

External links
 

Living people
1973 births
Sportspeople from Kraków
Polish male boxers
Heavyweight boxers